Orange Lake may refer to:

Orange Lake, Florida, an unincorporated community
Orange Lake (Florida), the body of water for which the above community is named
Orange Lake, New York, a hamlet and census-designated place
Orange Lake (New York), the body of water for which the above community is named